Mohsen Hassanzadeh (born 28 September 1974) is an Iranian professional futsal coach and former player.

Personal life
He is the older brother of Ali Asghar Hassanzadeh and Mehdi Hassanzadeh.

Honours

Player

 Iranian Futsal Super League
 Champion (1): 2003–04 (Shensa)
 Runners-up (2): 2008–09 (Eram Kish), 2012–13 (Saba)
 Iran Futsal's 1st Division
 Champion (2): 2004–05 (Elmo Adab), 2010–11 (Shahrdari Saveh)

Manager

 Iranian Futsal Super League
 Runners-up (1): 2012–13 (Saba)
 Iranian Futsal Hazfi Cup
 Champion (1): 2013–14 (Mahan Tandis)

References 

1974 births
Living people
People from Qom
Iranian men's futsal players
Futsal defenders
Shensa Saveh FSC players
Elmo Adab FSC players
Almas Shahr Qom FSC players
Shahrdari Saveh FSC players
Farsh Ara FSC players
Iranian futsal coaches
Iranian expatriate futsal players
Shahid Mansouri FSC managers